Brisbane is a lunar impact crater that is located in the southeastern part of the Moon, to the south of the crater Peirescius. To the northwest lie the craters Vega and Reimarus, and farther to the east is the walled plain Lyot. Due to its proximity to the limb, foreshortening of this crater causes it to appear somewhat elliptical in shape, even though it is actually circular.

This is an old, eroded crater with features that have become somewhat softened and rounded due to a history of subsequent minor impacts. There are small craterlets along the rim, most notably along the western wall and the northeast inner wall. There is also a groove overlying the southwest rim. The interior floor is nearly level and contains no significant impacts. There is a slight central rise at the midpoint.

Satellite craters
By convention these features are identified on lunar maps by placing the letter on the side of the crater midpoint that is closest to Brisbane.

References

External links
 

Impact craters on the Moon